John Timothee (4 February 1870 – 10 December 1901) was an Australian rules footballer who played with Melbourne in the Victorian Football League (VFL).

Notes

External links 

 

1870 births
1901 deaths
Australian rules footballers from Melbourne
Melbourne Football Club players